Jake Joshua Burton (born 15 November 2001) is an English professional footballer who plays as a forward for EFL League Two side Tranmere Rovers.

Playing career

Tranmere Rovers
Burton graduated through the academy at Tranmere Rovers, breaking into the first team squad alongside George Nugent and Kyle Hayde.  He made his first team debut for the club in a 2–1 defeat to Leicester City F.C. Under-21's in the 2019–20 EFL Trophy, and signed his first professional contract in July 2020. He made his English Football League debut on 10 October 2020 starting in a match against Salford City. He made one further league appearance that season, played in an FA Cup match and featured in Tranmere's losing 2021 EFL Trophy Final appearance against Sunderland on 14 March 2021.

Burton returned from a loan spell for the start of the 2022-23 season, scoring in the clubs first pre-season friendly; a 2-2 draw against Fleetwood, and appeared as a 65th minute substitute in the clubs 2nd pre-season friendly, a 1-0 victory over Preston North End.

After a short loan spell at Marine, Burton was recalled prior to the visit of Colchester United & replaced Elliott Nevitt in the 80th minute of the game. He scored his first senior goal for the club after just 3 minutes on the pitch; latching on to a Paul Lewis cross to head home Tranmere's second goal of the game.

Loan periods
In September 2021 he went on a month's loan to Stalybridge Celtic. This loan was twice extended by a month each time until the end of the year.  He made 15 appearances for the club, including 11 in the Northern Premier League, scoring three goals.  He returned to the club towards the end of March 2022 for a second loan spell.

Burton joined Marine A.F.C. at the start of the 2022–23 season, initially on loan until January 2023, but was recalled after one month, having played in all 4 of Marine's league games; scoring twice.

Career statistics

Honours
Tranmere Rovers
 EFL Trophy runner-up: 2020–21

References

2001 births
Living people
Association football forwards
English Football League players
English footballers
Northern Premier League players
Stalybridge Celtic F.C. players
Tranmere Rovers F.C. players